"Take My Scars" is a song by American heavy metal band Machine Head from the album The More Things Change.... It was released as a single on November 24, 1997 and is also available on the band's live album Hellalive. The song is sung from the viewpoint of the Devil.

"Take My Scars" was featured on the soundtrack of the 2000 film Faust: Love of the Damned.

Track listing

Digipack version
 "Take My Scars" – 4:21
 "Negative Creep" (Nirvana cover) – 2:40
 "Ten Ton Hammer" (Demo version) – 5:01
 "Struck a Nerve" (Demo version) – 3:35

Slimcase version
 "Take My Scars" – 4:21
 "Negative Creep" (Nirvana cover) – 2:40
 "Take My Scars" (Live) – 4:24
 "Blood for Blood" (Live) – 3:55

Japanese EP version
 "Take My Scars" – 5:24
 "Negative Creep" (Nirvana Cover) – 2:40
 "Ten Ton Hammer" (Demo version) – 4:55
 "Struck a Nerve" (Demo version) – 3:35
 "Take My Scars" (Live) – 4:26
 "Struck a Nerve" (Live) – 4:10
 "A Thousand Lies" (Live) – 7:14
 "Blood for Blood" (Live) – 4:14
 "Violate" (Live) – 7:31

Charts

References

1997 singles
Machine Head (band) songs
Roadrunner Records singles
1997 songs
Songs written by Adam Duce
Songs written by Robb Flynn
Songs written by Dave McClain (drummer)
Songs written by Logan Mader